Wilhelm Müseler (1887 in Berlin – 1952 in Göttingen) was an equestrian and author. He wrote an important treatise on horse riding, Reitlehre (1933), and many works on the history of art.

Published works

Riding 
 Reitlehre Berlin: Parey 1933 (2nd edition)
 Riding Logic (translation of Reitlehre by F. W. Schiller) London: Methuen 1937

History of art 
 Deutsche Kunst im Wandel der Zeiten Berlin: Gutenberg [1935]
 Geist und Antlitz der romanischen Zeit Berlin: Boldt 1936
 Geist und Antlitz der Gotik Berlin: Safari-Verlag 1936
 Geist und Antlitz der Renaissance Berlin: Safari-Verlag 1937
 Geist und Antlitz des Barock Berlin: Safari-Verlag 1937
 Europäische Kunst Berlin: Safari-Verlag [1939]
 Europäische Malerei Berlin: Safari-Verlag 1948
 Kunst der Welt: Die alten Kulturen (with Felix Dargel) Berlin: Safari-Verlag 1952 (posthumous)
 Wandlungen in der deutschen Dichtung: Ein Weg zum Überblick (with Irma von Hugo) Göttingen: Musterschmidt-Verlag 1956 (posthumous)

See also 
 List of writers on horsemanship

References 

1887 births
1952 deaths
German male equestrians
Writers on horsemanship